Muna el-Kurd (born 15 May 1998) is a Palestinian activist based in the neighbourhood of Sheikh Jarrah in East Jerusalem. Alongside her twin brother, Mohammed el-Kurd, she drew international attention for her involvement in the Sheikh Jarrah controversy, which served as a key trigger for the 2021 Israel–Palestine crisis. She has regularly protested Israel's eviction of Palestinians in East Jerusalem, and gained prominence for her activism on a variety of social media channels.

Early life 
El-Kurd was born into a family of Palestinian Muslims in the neighbourhood of Sheikh Jarrah, East Jerusalem, on 15 May 1998. From a young age, she and her family experienced threats of eviction from their home by Israeli authorities.

In 2009, part of her family's home in Sheikh Jarrah was seized by Israeli settlers.

2021 Israel–Palestine crisis 

In 2021, Muna's family was among 11 other Palestinian families who were threatened with eviction from their home per a decision by an Israeli court (see Sheikh Jarrah controversy). They were given 30 days to leave the home, but the family's lawyer filed an appeal with the district court. Tensions between Israeli authorities and Palestinians in East Jerusalem eventually triggered the 2021 Israel–Palestine crisis.

On 6 June 2021, Muna and her brother Mohammed were arrested by Israeli police; they were later released on the same day after being detained for several hours.

During this period, both Muna and Mohammed were named on TIME 100.

References

External links 
 

1998 births
Living people
Birzeit University alumni
Palestinian activists
Palestinian Muslims
People from Jerusalem